The Grande Région (French) or Großregion (German) programme lies within the Interreg IV A programme of the European Union's European Regional Development Fund. It facilitates cooperation between project partners from the different parts of the Greater Region of SaarLorLux: Luxembourg (the country), the Belgian provinces of Luxembourg and Liège, the French Lorraine region as well as the Saarland and large parts of Rhineland-Palatinate. The programme covers the period 2007-2013. Projects approved within the programme receive financial aid of up to 50% of their budget.

History
The following programmes were forerunners of the current INTERREG IV Greater Region programme:
Wallonia-Lorraine-Luxembourg
Germany-Luxembourg-German Speaking Community of Belgium
Saar-Moselle-Lorraine-Western Palatinate
Interreg C "E-bird"

Aims
The programme facilitates cross-border cooperation among the different stakeholders of the Greater Region and promotes the realisation of local and regional projects.

Programme partners
Eleven bodies within the Greater Region are the programme partners:
the government of Luxembourg, Ministry of the Interior and Spatial Planning
the government of Wallonia
the government of the French community of Belgium
the government of the German-speaking community of Belgium
the council of the Meuse département in France
the council of the Meurthe-et-Moselle département
the council of the Moselle département]
the préfecture of Lorraine region in France
the Ministry of Economy, Transport, Agriculture and Viniculture of Rhineland-Palatinate in Germany
the Ministry of Economy and Science of Saarland

Programme
The programme has three main focuses: "economy", "space" and "humans".

Economy
The aim is to boost competitiveness of the interregional economy, to promote innovation and improve the labour market.
Scheme 1.1 – Promotion of innovation
Scheme 1.2 – Promotion of common projects to strengthen the economic structure
Scheme 1.3 – Development of cross-border economic infrastructure
Scheme 1.4 – Encouragement of cross-border working
Scheme 1.5 – Promotion of the tourist offer

Space
Improve the quality of life, enhance of the attractiveness of the different areas and protection of the environment. 
Scheme 2.1 – Promotion of spatial development policy
Scheme 2.2 – Promotion of mobility in the Greater Region
Scheme 2.3 – Upgrading and safeguarding of the environment

Humans
Promote acquisition and diffusion of knowledge, use of cultural resources and strengthening of social cohesion.
Scheme 3.1 – Cooperation in education and continuing education
Scheme 3.2 – Strengthening of university cooperation
Scheme 3.3 – Encouragement of cooperation in health care management
Scheme 3.4 – Encouragement of cooperation in social work
Scheme 3.5 – Encouragement and upgrading of culture and cooperation in the media

Approved projects
As of 2010 66 projects have been approved and will get financial support from Interreg.

References

External links
 Grossregion-Grande Région
 INTERREG IV A Grossregion
 Uni Greater Region
 Plurio.net - the official cultural portal of the Greater Region
 Verein Kulturraum Großregion

Regional policies of the European Union